Kach or Koch or Kech in Iran may refer to:
 Kach, Hamadan
 Kach, Khuzestan
 Koch, Chabahar, Sistan and Baluchestan Province
 Koch, Dashtiari, Chabahar County, Sistan and Baluchestan Province
 Koch-e Garg, Chabahar County, Sistan and Baluchestan Province
 Koch Gowrow, Chabahar County, Sistan and Baluchestan Province
 Koch-e Yusof, Chabahar County, Sistan and Baluchestan Province
 Kach Kurin, Iranshahr County, Sistan and Baluchestan Province
 Kach Kush, Iranshahr County, Sistan and Baluchestan Province
 Kach, Qasr-e Qand, Sistan and Baluchestan Province